The 13th National Film Awards, then known as State Awards for Films, presented by Ministry of Information and Broadcasting, India to felicitate the best of Indian Cinema released in 1965.

Starting with 13th National Film Awards, a new award was introduced at All India level, Best Feature Film on National Unity and Emotional Integration whose winner received a cash prize.

Awards 

Awards were divided into feature films and non-feature films.

President's gold medal for the All India Best Feature Film is now better known as National Film Award for Best Feature Film, whereas President's gold medal for the Best Documentary Film is analogous to today's National Film Award for Best Non-Feature Film. For children's films, Prime Minister's gold medal is now given as National Film Award for Best Children's Film. At the regional level, President's silver medal for Best Feature Film is now given as National Film Award for Best Feature Film in a particular language. Certificate of Merit in all the categories is discontinued over the years.

Feature films 

Feature films were awarded at All India as well as regional level. For the 13th National Film Awards, a Hindi film Shaheed won the maximum number of awards (three). Following were the awards given:

All India Award 

For 13th National Film Awards, none of the films were awarded from Children's Films category as no film was found to be suitable; instead Certificate of Merit is awarded. Following were the awards given in each category:

Regional Award 

The awards were given to the best films made in the regional languages of India. For feature films in Gujarati and Punjabi, President's silver medal for Best Feature Film was not given, instead Certificate of Merit for Best Feature Film was given.

Non-feature films 

Non-feature film awards were given for the documentaries, educational films and film strips made in the country. For the 13th National Film Awards, no award was given in the filmstrip category and only Certificate of Merit was awarded for Educational Films. Following were the awards given for the non-feature films category:

Documentaries

Educational films

Awards not given 

Following were the awards not given as no film was found to be suitable for the award:

 Prime Minister's gold medal for the Best Children's Film
 President's gold medal for the Best Documentary Film
 Prime Minister's gold medal for the Best Educational Film
 President's silver medal for Best Feature Film in Assamese
 President's silver medal for Best Feature Film in English
 President's silver medal for Best Feature Film in Oriya
 President's silver medal for Best Feature Film in Punjabi

References

External links 
 National Film Awards Archives
 Official Page for Directorate of Film Festivals, India

National Film Awards (India) ceremonies
National Film Awards
National Film Awards